Goa Praja Party (GPP) is a regional political party in Goa. The party was founded by Pandurang Raut and Prakash Fadte. It was led by Pandurang Raut.
The Goa Praja Party allied with Shiv Sena, Maharashtrawadi Gomantak Party and Goa Suraksha Manch to contest the 2017 Goa Legislative Assembly election. The alliance contested in 33 out of the total 40 constituencies.

References

Political parties in Goa
Indian Hindu political parties
Maharashtrawadi Gomantak Party
Political parties established in 2015
2015 establishments in Goa
Regionalist parties in India